| tries = {{#expr:
 + 8 + 3 + 5 + 6 + 6 + 1 + 5
 + 4 + 5 + 7 + 6 + 9 + 5 + 3
 + 3 + 7 + 8 + 10 + 11 + 7 + 4
 + 9 + 6 + 9 + 5 + 3 + 6 + 4
 + 6 + 9 + 2 + 2 + 10 + 6 + 10
 + 7 + 6 + 4 + 4 + 5 + 5 + 3
 + 10 + 5 + 7 + 6 + 5 + 4 + 7
 + 8 + 6 + 3 + 7 + 11 + 5 + 8
 + 8 + 8 + 6 + 7 + 6 + 5 + 4
 + 10 + 6 + 3 + 5 + 10 + 5 + 7
 + 2 + 3 + 1 + 3 + 9 + 2 
 + 5 + 4 + 2 + 4 + 5 + 3 
 + 5 + 3 + 6 + 3 + 7 + 6 + 6
 + 3
 + 0 + 5 + 4 + 13 + 2 + 2 + 5
 + 11
 + 7 + 7 + 1 + 10 + 6 + 6 + 10
 + 9 + 3 + 12 + 10 + 5 + 8 + 9
 + 4 + 6 + 3 + 1 + 7 + 7 + 5
 + 8 + 6 + 4 + 6 + 8 + 8 + 7
 + 5 + 9 + 6 + 1 + 4 + 6 + 5
 + 7 + 5 + 8 + 7 + 9 + 6 + 6
 + 9 + 4 + 4 + 12 + 5 + 5 + 5
 + 1 + 3
 + 10 + 2
 + 4
}}
| highest attendance = 51,297Dragons v Scarlets, Cardiff v Ospreys (27 April 2019)
| lowest attendance = 1,142Kings v Leinster (4 November 2018)
| top point scorer = 
| top try scorer = 
| website = www.pro14rugby.org
| prevseason = 2017–18
| nextseason = 2019–20
}}

The 2018–19 Pro14 (also known as the Guinness Pro14 for sponsorship reasons) is the eighteenth season of the professional rugby union competition originally known as the Celtic League. It was the second season to be referred to as the Pro14 (the competition was named the Pro12 immediately prior to the addition of two South African teams).

Fourteen teams competed in 2018-19 — four Irish teams: Connacht, Leinster, Munster and Ulster; two Italian teams: Benetton and Zebre; two Scottish teams: Edinburgh and Glasgow Warriors; two South African teams: Cheetahs and the Southern Kings; and four Welsh teams: Cardiff Blues, Dragons, Ospreys and Scarlets.

Leinster were the defending champions, having won the 2017–18 final at the Aviva Stadium to take their fifth title in the competition's various iterations and seal a domestic league and European Cup double, becoming only the sixth team to do so and the first from the Pro14.

Teams

Format

 League Stage

The fourteen teams are split into two conferences of seven teams, with each conference featuring two teams from Ireland and Wales plus one team from Italy, Scotland and South Africa. To ensure a competitive balance, the teams are distributed approximately evenly between the conferences based upon their performance in the previous season.

The regular season is made up of 21 rounds –
6 home and 6 away games against each team in their own conference
7 games, either home or away, against the teams in the other conference
2 additional regional derbies
Each Irish team plays the two Irish teams in the other conference, one at home and one away
Each Welsh team plays the two Welsh teams in the other conference, one at home and one away
The two Italian teams play each other twice, home and away
The two Scottish teams play each other twice, home and away
The two South African teams play each other twice, home and away

 League Play-Offs

The first-placed teams in each conference are given a bye to the semi-finals with the second and third placed teams in each conference meeting in two quarter-finals for the two remaining semi-final places.

 Qualification For Champions Cup

The South African teams cannot compete in the European Rugby Champions Cup. The top three eligible European teams in each conference automatically qualify for following year's Champions Cup. The fourth ranked eligible team in each conference meet in a play-off match with the winner taking the seventh Champions Cup place.

Team changes

Ireland
Connacht came into the new season with a new head coach, after removing Kieran Keane from his position one year into a three-year deal. Former Australia sevens coach Andy Friend was named as his replacement in May 2018, joining on a three-year contract. The team also had a new captain for the season, following the retirement of John Muldoon, record-holder for appearances both for Connacht and in the league. In August 2018, Jarrad Butler was named as his replacement.

Like Connacht, Leinster had a new captain for the season. Isa Nacewa retired at the end of the 2017–18 season, after leading the province to an unprecedented Pro14-Champions Cup double. The team's all-time leading scorer Johnny Sexton was named as captain in August 2018, with Rhys Ruddock as his vice-captain. The team also had a new backs coach following the departure of Girvan Dempsey, who signed with English Premiership side Bath in May 2018. Former player Felipe Contepomi was announced as his replacement in June 2018. He joined from the Argentine Rugby Union where he had been serving both as part of the coaching staff of Super Rugby side, the Jaguares, and as head coach of Argentina XV, the country's second tier international side.

Munster came into the league without their all-time leading try scorer Simon Zebo. It was announced in October 2017 that he would leave the province at the end of the 2017–18 season, with French Top 14 side Racing 92 later being confirmed as his next club.

Following the departure of Les Kiss as the province's director of rugby in January 2018, Ulster confirmed in March 2018 that then-head coach Jono Gibbes would leave the province at the end of the season. In April 2018, the province announced that Scotland forwards coach Dan McFarland would be their new head coach, with the former Connacht and Glasgow assistant signing a three-year contract. However the Scottish Rugby Union insisted that McFarland must serve the nine-month notice period in his contract before joining Ulster, which would have left the province without a head coach until January 2019. In July 2018, it was announced that Ireland forwards coach Simon Easterby would work with the Ulster coaches on an interim basis ahead of McFarland's arrival. After a four-month standoff, an agreement was reached in August 2018 to allow McFarland to take up his position with Ulster with immediate effect. Another addition to the coaching staff was long-serving squad member and  international Jared Payne, who was forced to retire in May 2018 due to a head injury suffered on the 2017 Lions tour. The province announced that he would serve as their new defence coach. Banbridge head coach Daniel Soper was confirmed as Ulster's skills coach in June 2018.

Italy
Having served as one of the team's co-captain's,  centre Tommaso Castello was named as the Zebre skipper for the season. He had previously shared the captaincy with George Biagi.

Scotland
After spending much of the previous two seasons playing in the 5,500-capacity Myreside Stadium, Edinburgh announced in February 2018 that they would be returning permanently to Murrayfield, their previous home. Due to the stadium's larger size making it inappropriate for permanent use, the Scottish Rugby Union also announced plans to develop another, smaller ground with a capacity of 7,800 in the grounds of Murrayfield, on what were previously training pitches. It was estimated that the development would cost the Union in the region of £5 million.

South Africa
The Cheetahs had a new captain for the 2018–19 season. It was announced in March 2018 that incumbent captain Francois Venter would leave the team at the end of the season, joining English side Worcester Warriors.

Wales
Cardiff Blues confirmed in September 2017 that then-head coach Danny Wilson would leave the club at the end of the 2017–18 season, with John Mulvihill being announced as their new head coach on a three-year contract in March 2018. Also departing the club was the team's most-capped player, Taufaʻao Filise. The Tongan international prop made his last appearance for the region in the final of the 2017–18 Challenge Cup, before retiring. In July 2018, Ellis Jenkins was named as the new team captain, replacing previous season's skipper Gethin Jenkins. Both players were also named as part of a 10-man "leadership group" within the squad.

In December 2018, Dragons parted company with head coach Bernard Jackman 18 months into a three-year deal. The team's forwards coach Ceri Jones was named as caretaker following Jackman's departure. In January 2019, it was announced that Jones would remain in the role until the end of the season.

The Ospreys were coached by Allen Clarke. He had started the previous season as the team's forwards coach, before being promoted to head coach on an interim basis in January 2018 following the sacking of Steve Tandy. In April 2018, it was announced that Clarke would take the job on a permanent basis and had signed a three-year contract. For the first time in eight seasons, the side came into the campaign with a new captain, with Justin Tipuric replacing Alun Wyn Jones in the role.

This was Wayne Pivac's final season in charge of the Scarlets, as it was announced in July 2018 that he would succeed Warren Gatland as  head coach. The agreement meant Pivac would take up the role following the 2019 World Cup.

Table

Match summary

Conference Rounds 1 to 21
All times are local.

Round 1

Round 2

Round 3

Round 4

Round 5

Round 6

Round 7

Round 8

Round 9

Round 10

Round 11

1872 Cup 1st round

Round 12

1872 Cup 2nd round

Round 13

Round 11 Catch up

Round 14

Round 12 Catch up

Round 15

Round 16

Round 17

Round 18

Round 19

Round 20

Round 21

Judgement Day

1872 Cup 3rd round

Play-offs

The top side from each of the two conferences are given a bye to the semi-finals and have home advantage. Teams placed second and third in opposite conferences meet in the two quarter-finals to determine the other two semi-finalists with the teams ranked second having home advantage.

The play-offs are scheduled in the four weeks after the regular season has been completed.

Quarter-finals

Semi-finals

Final

Play-off for the 7th Champions Cup place

South African teams cannot compete in the European Rugby Champions Cup as it is restricted to European teams. The top three eligible teams in the two conferences automatically qualify for the following year's Champions Cup. The seventh Champions Cup place is allocated to the winners of the playoff match between the fourth ranked eligible teams in each conference played at the home of the team with the most regular league points.

As Leinster lost the Champions Cup final on 11 May 2019, Ospreys hosted Scarlets in the play-off on 18 May 2019.

Referees
Pro14 2018–19 14-man referee elite squad: (number of matches refereed):

  Mike Adamson (SRU) – (21)
  Stuart Berry (SARU) – (14)
  Andrew Brace (IRFU) – (35)
  George Clancy (IRFU) – (102)
  Ian Davies (WRU) – (72)
  Sean Gallagher (IRFU) – (9)
  Quinton Immelman (SARU) – (10)
  Dan Jones (WRU) – (14)
  John Lacey (IRFU) – (70)
  Lloyd Linton (SRU) – (21)
  Marius Mitrea (FIR) – (78)
  Frank Murphy (IRFU) – (14)
  Andrea Piardi (FIR) – (1)
  Nigel Owens (WRU) – (166)
  Ben Whitehouse (WRU) – (46)

Note: Additional referees are used throughout the season, selected from a select development squad that includes; Craig Evans (2) and Adam Jones (0) – both WRU, Sam Grove-White (3), Ben Blain (2), Keith Allen (1) – SRU and Joy Neville (1) – IRFU

Attendances by club
 Includes quarter-finals and semi-finals – the final is not included as it is held at a neutral venue.  Due to the Conference A & B structure of 21 rounds in the Pro14, some teams were allotted 10 league home games during the league stage, while others received 11. Cardiff Blues and Dragons each gave up a home game in the final round of fixtures for Judgement Day, leaving them with nine home games. These figures do not include the final (at a neutral venue) or the European Champions Cup play-off game.

Highest attendances

Player awards

PRO14 Dream Team
The 2018–19 Pro14 Dream Team is:

Award winners
The 2018–19 Pro14 season award winners are:

Leading scorers
Note: Flags to the left of player names indicate national team as has been defined under World Rugby eligibility rules, or primary nationality for players who have not yet earned international senior caps. Players may hold one or more non-WR nationalities.

Most points

Most tries

Notes

References

External links
 Official website

 
2018–19 in European rugby union leagues
2018-19
2018–19 in Irish rugby union
2018–19 in Italian rugby union
2018–19 in Scottish rugby union
2018–19 in Welsh rugby union
2018 in South African rugby union
2019 in South African rugby union